Communication deviance (CD) occurs when a speaker fails to effectively communicate meaning to their listener with confusing speech patterns or illogical patterns. These disturbances can range from vague linguistic references, contradictory statements to more encompassing non-verbal problems at the level of turn-taking. 

The term was originally introduced by Lyman Wynne and Margaret Singer in 1963 to describe a communication style found among parents who had children with schizophrenia. According to Wynne, people are able to focus their attention and identify meaning from external stimuli beginning with their interactions, particularly with their parents, during their early years of life. In family communication, deviance is present in the way members acknowledge or affirm one another as well as in task performance.

A recent meta-analysis reported that communication deviance is highly prevalent in parents of patients diagnosed with schizophrenia  and adoption studies have reported significant associations between CD in the parent and thought disorder in the offspring, however, the mechanisms by which CD impacts on the offspring's cognition are still unknown. Some researchers theorize that, in the case of a high degree of egocentric communication in parents where the sender and the receiver do not speak and listen according to each other's premises, the child develops uncertainty.

The research of psychiatrists and psychoanalysts Lyman Wynne and Theodore Lidz on communication deviance and roles (e.g., pseudo-mutuality, pseudo-hostility, schism and skew) in families of people with schizophrenia also became influential with systems-communications-oriented theorists and therapists.

See also
 Stilted speech
 Alogia
 Schizophrenia
 Psychosis

References

Communication disorders